Xu Zheng (born 10 May 1981 in Beijing, China) baseball player who is a member of Team China at the 2008 Summer Olympics.

Sports career
1998 National Youth Team;
1999 Beijing Municipal Team;
2001 National Team

Major performances
1999 Asian Youth Tournament - 4th;
2003-2005 National League - 1st;
2003 Olympic Qualification - 4th;
2003 World Baseball Classic Asia Zone - 4th;
2005 National Games - 2nd;
2007 Japan Konami Cup - 4th

References
Profile 2008 Olympics Team China
 CBL Official page 

1981 births
Living people
2006 World Baseball Classic players
Baseball players at the 2008 Summer Olympics
Chinese baseball players
Olympic baseball players of China
Baseball players from Beijing
Beijing Tigers players